Epermenia gaedikei is a moth of the family Epermeniidae. It is found in Uzbekistan and the area around Dekhanobad and Derbent.

References

Moths described in 2003
Epermeniidae
Insects of Central Asia
Moths of Asia